Vinyl Cafe Stories (1998) is a two-CD album by Stuart McLean released in 1998 by Vinyl Cafe Productions.

These stories were recorded in concert at Glenn Gould Studio at The CBC Broadcasting Centre in Toronto during 1997 and 1998, at the Centrepointe Theatre in Nepean, Ontario, on January 14, 1998, The Arts and Culture Centre in St. John's, Newfoundland, on March 10, 1998, and at the Rebecca Cohn Auditorium in Halifax on May 12, 1998.

They were recorded in concert for the CBC Radio show The Vinyl Cafe.

Track listing
Disc 1
 "The Jock Strap" – 9:16
 "Holland" – 18:48
 "Driving Lessons" – 7:57
 "School Days" – 17:13
 "The Bird" – 17:37

Disc 2
 "Cat in the Car" – 18:51
 "Emil" – 14:31
 "A Day Off" – 10:08
 "Polly Anderson's Christmas Party" – 23:02

See also
Stuart McLean
List of Dave and Morley stories

References

External links
 Vinyl Cafe with Stuart McLean - The Official Website

Stuart McLean albums
1998 live albums